Kuhestan Rural District may refer to:
 Kuhestan Rural District (Ajab Shir County)
 Kuhestan Rural District (Fars Province)
 Kuhestan Rural District (Isfahan Province)
 Kuhestan Rural District (Kerman Province)
 Kuhestan Rural District (Behshahr County), in Mazandaran Province
 Kuhestan Rural District (Chalus County), in Mazandaran Province